Tanium is a privately held cybersecurity and systems management company with headquarters in Kirkland, Washington and its operations center in Emeryville, California.

It was founded July 16, 2007 by father and son David Hindawi and Orion Hindawi, co-founders of information management company BigFix. 

On May 3rd, 2018, TPG Growth made a $175 million investment in the company.

Tanium's valuation is US$10 billion.

References 

2007 establishments in California
Companies based in Emeryville, California
Business services companies established in 2007
Computer security companies